The Pungsan, Phungsan, Korean Phungsan, or Poongsan (Chosongul: 풍산개;) is a breed of hunting dog from Korea, named for originating in Kim Hyong Gwon County, formerly Phungsan county. They were bred in the Kaema highlands of what is now North Korea, and were traditionally used as hunting dogs. The dog is a rare breed, and is sometimes smuggled over the North Korea–China border. The dog was made a national monument of North Korea in April 1956, and the national dog of the DPRK in 2014.

Breed
According to NK News, international kennel clubs consider Pungsan dogs as "little more than a local Spitz-type variant of Siberian huskies, only less physically impressive and with behavioral issues".

History
According to the Encyclopedia of Korean Culture by the Academy of Korean Studies under the Ministry of Education, Science and Technology (South Korea) of the South Korean government, the Pungsan dog was first recognized as a national symbol in the Korean peninsula during the Japanese colonial period. The breed was also used in Russia to hunt tigers, bears, and warthogs. The Pungsan dog breed was bred for a long time in isolation from other provinces.

During the 2000 inter-Korean summit, North Korean leader Kim Jong-il made a gift of two Pungsan dogs (associated with the North) to South Korean president Kim Dae-jung. In return, Kim Dae-jung gave two Jindo dogs (associated with the South) to Kim Jong-il. Born at the Pyongyang Central Zoo, the Pungsan dogs were originally named Dangyol (Unity) and Jaju (Independence), but were later renamed Uri (meaning We) and Duri (Two). They initially lived in the Blue House, the residence of the South Korean president, before being moved to the Seoul Zoo, where they gave birth to 15 puppies before both dying at age 13. During their lives, the dogs were accorded special status as guests of the state.

At the Pyongyang summit in 2018, North Korean leader Kim Jong-un gave two Pungsan dogs to South Korean President Moon Jae-in. The male was named Songkang, and the female was named Gomi. Gomi gave birth to six puppies within two months of the summit, leading Moon to remark that she must have been pregnant when she was given to him. He later published photos of them at the Blue House on November 25, 2018, and labeled them as "peace gift" puppies.

Culture
The dog was promoted as a national symbol in the 2010 children's animated film, Story of the Pungsan Dog, and in Paek Myeong Kil's 2017 novel, Pungsan Dogs. Dog shows are held specifically for this breed.

See also
 Dogs portal
 List of dog breeds
 Donggyeongi
 Nureongi
 Sapsali
 North Korea–South Korea relations

References

Further reading

External links

Dog breeds originating in Korea
Hunting dogs
Rare dog breeds
Spitz breeds